Malbaša is a surname. Notable people with the surname include:

Nebojša Malbaša (born 1959), Serbian footballer and manager
Nikola Malbaša (born 1977), Serbian footballer

Serbian surnames